The Braille Authority of North America (BANA) is the standardizing body of English Braille orthography in the United States and Canada. It consists of a number of member organizations, such as the Braille Institute of America, the National Braille Association, and the Canadian National Institute for the Blind.

In late 2012 BANA announced the gradual phasing in of Unified English Braille for general use. Nemeth Code (1972) will continue to be used for mathematics and science, Music Braille Code (1997) for musical notation, and IPA Braille Code (2008) for linguistics.

Member organizations
The following organizations are members of the BANA:

Full members

 Alternate Text Production Center of the California Community Colleges (ATPC) 
 American Council of the Blind
 American Foundation for the Blind
 American Printing House for the Blind
 Association for Education and Rehabilitation of the Blind & Visually Impaired
 Associated Services for the Blind and Visually Impaired
 Braille Institute of America
 California Transcribers and Educators for the Blind and Visually Impaired
 Clovernook Center for the Blind and Visually Impaired
 CNIB (Canadian National Institute for the Blind) 
 Council of Schools and Services for the Blind
 Hadley Institute for the Blind and Visually Impaired
 Horizons for the Blind
 National Braille Association
 National Braille Press, Inc.
 National Federation of the Blind
 National Library Service for the Blind and Physically Handicapped

Associate members
 Braille Authority of New Zealand Aotearoa Trust
 Crawford Technologies
 T-Base Communications

References

External links
 

Braille organizations